Ullsfjord Church is a parish church of the Church of Norway in Tromsø Municipality in Troms og Finnmark county, Norway. It is located in the village of Sjursnes on the eastern shore of the Ullsfjorden. It is the main church for the Ullsfjord parish which is part of the Tromsø domprosti (arch-deanery) in the Diocese of Nord-Hålogaland. The white, wooden church was built in a long church style in 1862 by the architect Christian Heinrich Grosch. The church seats about 300 people.

See also
List of churches in Nord-Hålogaland

References

Churches in Tromsø
Churches in Troms
Wooden churches in Norway
19th-century Church of Norway church buildings
Churches completed in 1862
1862 establishments in Norway
Long churches in Norway